Rakshadhikari Baiju Oppu is a 2017 Indian Malayalam-language comedy-drama film written and directed by Ranjan Pramod and produced by 100th Monkey Movies. It stars Biju Menon in the lead role with Aju Varghese and Hannah Reji Koshy playing supporting roles. The songs and background score are composed by Bijibal. The plot follows Baiju, a local sports club patron as he tries to resolve various issues taking place in their village in Kerala.

Rakshadhikari Baiju Oppu was released in India on 21 April 2017. The film won three Kerala State Film Awards—Best Film with Popular Appeal and Aesthetic Value, Best Sync Sound (for Smijith Kumar), and Best Child Artist (for Nakshatra).

Plot

The story revolves around a middle-aged man Baiju who works as a government employee and patron of a local arts and sports club.

Cast

Production
The production of the movie was started on 6 October 2016.

Release and reception
Rakshadhikari Baiju Oppu released on 21 April 2017. After having a slow start at the box office, it soon picked up pace and reportedly collected  8.32 crore in 21 days. The film completed 100 days run in theatres and fetched  23.6 crore gross.

Critical reviews to the film have been mostly positive. Lauding the film as a feel-good entertainer, Mythili Ramachandran of Gulf News wrote: "Rakshadhikari Baiju is a refreshing film with its characters leaving behind a nice feeling." Veeyen also gave a positive review, writing, "Clever, enjoyable, witty and poignant by turns, ‘Rakshadhikari Baiju Oppu’ is an entertaining character drama with a subtle, pertinent note concealed within its folds."

Baradwaj Rangan of Film Companion South wrote "Baiju is beautifully shot and edited. The frames are dense – there's always something happening in the background. The camera could change its focus, and there’d be another set of lives, another set of stories to follow."

Music
Music album was released by the label Millennium audios.
"Mohabathin Munthirineere" - Bijibal, Rakesh Brahmanandan
"Njaanee Oonjaalil" - P. Jayachandran, Chithra Arun
"Aakaasham Panthalu Ketti" - Sudeep Kumar
"Vellilappoovine" - Anakha Sadan
"Raasaathi Ivan" - Anuradha Sriram
"Jeevithamennathu" - Arun Alat
"Kathiravanivide" - Bhavya Lakshmi, Bijibal

References

External links
 

Films scored by Bijibal
2010s Malayalam-language films
Films set in Kerala
Films shot in Kerala
Indian family films